Savad Rudbar (also Romanized as Savād Rūdbār and Savād-e Rūd Bār) is a village in Valupey Rural District, in the Central District of Savadkuh County, Mazandaran Province, Iran. At the 2006 census, its population was 125, in 44 families.

References 

Populated places in Savadkuh County